This is a list of named craters on 253 Mathilde, an asteroid of the asteroid belt, approximately 53 kilometers in diameter. Because Mathilde is a dark, carbonaceous body, all of its craters have been named after famous coalfields from across the world. As of 2017, there are 23 officially named craters on this asteroid.

List 

back to top

See also 
 List of craters on minor planets
 List of craters in the Solar System

References

External links 
 Gazetteer of Planetary Nomenclature, International Astronomical Union (IAU) Working Group for Planetary System Nomenclature (WGPSN)

253 Mathilde

Mathilde
Mathilde